Lanassa is a genus of annelids belonging to the family Terebellidae.

The genus has almost cosmopolitan distribution.

Species:

Lanassa benthaliana 
Lanassa capensis 
Lanassa exelysis 
Lanassa gracilis 
Lanassa nordenskioeldi 
Lanassa nordenskioldi 
Lanassa ocellata 
Lanassa praecox 
Lanassa sarsi 
Lanassa venusta

References

Annelids